Afonso of Portugal is the name of:

Kings

 Afonso I Henriques (1109–1185), King of Portugal from 1139 to 1185
 Afonso II of Portugal (1185–1223), King of Portugal from 1212 to 1223
 Afonso III of Portugal (1210–1279), King of Portugal from 1248 to 1279
 Afonso IV of Portugal (1291–1357), King of Portugal from 1325 to 1357
 Afonso V of Portugal (1432–1481), King of Portugal from 1438 to 1481
 Afonso VI of Portugal (1643–1683), King of Portugal from 1656 to 1683

Princes and infantes

 Afonso of Portugal, Lord of Portalegre (1263–1312), son of Afonso III of Portugal
 Afonso of Portugal, Lord of Leiria (c. 1288 – c. 1300), Portuguese noble
  Afonso (1315–1315), son of Afonso IV
  Afonso (?–?; 14th century), son of Peter I of Portugal
  Afonso (1371 or 1382–1371 or 1382), son of Ferdinand I of Portugal
 Afonso, Duke of Braganza (1377–1461), natural son of John I of Portugal
  Afonso (1390–1390), son of John I of Portugal
 Afonso, Prince of Portugal (1475–1491), son of John II of Portugal
 Infante Cardinal Afonso of Portugal (1509–1540), son of Manuel I of Portugal
 Afonso, Prince of Portugal (1526) (1526–1526), son of John III of Portugal
 Infante Afonso, Duke of Porto (1865–1920), son of Luís I of Portugal